Zhang Shufeng (born 24 November 1984) is a Chinese high jumper. He is from Heilongjiang province. He was a two-time winner at the National Games of China and a one-time winner of the Chinese national championships.

He won the bronze medal at the 2005 Asian Championships and the 2005 East Asian Games. At the 2007 Summer Universiade and 2010 World Indoor Championships he failed to record a valid jump.

He was coached by former Asian Games champion Zhou Zhongge. Zhou developed Zhang from a 2.20 m jumper to a 2.30 m jumper, making him international class. The two focused on improving Zhang's explosive jump capacity and lowering his centre of gravity at take-off.

National titles
National Games of China
High jump: 2005, 2009
Chinese Athletics Championships
High jump: 2005

International competitions

References

1984 births
Living people
Athletes from Heilongjiang
Chinese male high jumpers
Competitors at the 2007 Summer Universiade
21st-century Chinese people